Blackwater River State may refer to:
Blackwater River State Forest, Florida
Blackwater River State Park, Florida